Haploa is a genus of tiger moths in the family Erebidae. The genus was erected by Jacob Hübner in 1820.

Larvae of these species are generally polyphagous, developing on host plants such as Populus, Salix, Prunus, and Rubus.

Species
Haploa clymene (Brown, 1776) – Clymene moth
Haploa colona (Hübner, [1804] 1800-1803) – colona moth
Haploa confusa (Lyman, 1887) – confused haploa moth
Haploa contigua (Walker, 1855) – neighbor moth
Haploa lecontei (Guérin-Méneville, 1832) – Leconte's haploa moth
Haploa reversa (Stretch, 1885) – reversed haploa moth

References

Callimorphina
Moth genera